CGTN Russian (formerly CCTV International Russian (Tsentral'noye Televideniye Kitaya Mezhdunarodnyy kanal na Russkom yazyke), ; often shorted as CCTV-Русский) is a Russian language international news, entertainment, and education television channel owned by China Central Television.

Launch 
The Russian-language channel was launched on September 10, 2009, on the occasion of the 60th anniversary of the establishment of diplomatic ties between Beijing and Moscow. CCTV Russian is broadcast through Chinasat 6B and EB-9A, which cover the Asian-Pacific Region, Middle East and Europe. The channel is aimed at about 300 million viewers in the post-Soviet nations (12 Commonwealth of Independent States members and three Baltic nations), and Eastern European countries. Since 2016, the channel is available on SPB TV's Belt and Road TV application.

Programs 
The channel broadcasts entirely in Russian, with 16 programs in the form of news, feature stories, entertainment and educational programs. Its daily schedule consists of 6-hour blocks. News broadcasts will be updated more often, while all feature programs air four times daily.

Controversies 
In 2020, in a report on the Two Sessions (plenary sessions of the National People's Congress and Chinese People's Political Consultative Conference), CGTN Russian used "Party of crooks and thieves", a derogative term to describe United Russia, in its video to introduce China's efforts to contain corruption, resulting in criticism from some Russian media.

See also 
 CCTV-4 (International Chinese)
 CGTN-Français (International French)
 CGTN-Español (International Spanish)
 CGTN-العربية (International Arabic)
 CGTN (International English)
 CNTV International

References

External links 

China Global Television Network channels
Foreign television channels broadcasting in the United Kingdom
24-hour television news channels in China
Cable television in Hong Kong
Russian-language television stations
Television channels and stations established in 2009
2009 establishments in China